Anne-Marie Loriot (born 12 August 1956) is a French sprint canoeist who competed in the late 1970s and early 1980s. Competing in two Summer Olympics, she earned her best finish of sixth in the K-2 500 m event at Moscow in 1980.

References
Sports-reference.com profile

1956 births
Canoeists at the 1976 Summer Olympics
Canoeists at the 1980 Summer Olympics
French female canoeists
Living people
Olympic canoeists of France